Dermot Hudson (born 20 July 1961)  is a British political activist with close relations with North Korea. He is the Chairman of the British Group for the Study of the Juche Idea, Chairman of United Kingdom Korean Friendship Association, and Chairman of the British Association for the Study of Songun Politics.

Hudson received a doctorate in socio-political science from the Pyongyang-based  in April 2016, after submitting a thesis titled In Defence of Songun. 

Hudson's works have been translated into German, Turkish, Spanish, Portugese, Russian and Korean.

In 2021 Happenstance Films released the short documentary film A Friend of Kim about Hudson.

Works 
Behind the Mirror of Lies -The Truth About the Democratic People's Republic of Korea. (2011).
Who Really Did Start the Korean War?. (2011).
 Red Flag Flying High in Juche Korea. (2012).
 The Cuban Missile Crisis, Songun and the DPRK. (2012).
 The Eternal People's Sun. (2012).
People's Korea celebrates 60th Anniversary of Victory in Fatherland Liberation War. (2013).
Juche Korea September 2012-forward under the banner of Kimilsungism-Kimjongilism. (2013). 
KIM JONG IL GREAT DEFENDER OF INDEPENDENCE, SONGUN AND SOCIALISM. (2013).
KIM JONG IL THE GREATEST CHAMPION OF JUSTICE AND INDEPENDENCE. (2014).  
 Peoples Korea Smashes Counter-Revolution. (2014). .
The Anti KFA McCarthyite Witchunt in the UK - -the real denial of human rights. (2015).  
Land of Anti-Imperialism and Independence-Report of Visit to Peoples Korea for the International Seminar on the Juche Idea for  Anti.Imperialism, Independence and Solidarity. (2016).
 In Defence Of Songun. (2017). .
 10th Visit to the land of Juche, Peoples Korea October 2015. (2017). .
Visit to the Juche People's Paradise to celebrate the 105th anniversary of the birth of the great leader comrade KIM IL SUNG. (2017).
 Dermot Hudson in Defence of Juche Korea!. (2018). .
 Victory Of Juche Korea Is A Science. (2018). .
 Travels In The Land Of Juche Korea, 1992–2017. -Personal recollections of visiting the Democratic People's Republic of Korea -travel notes and a bit of autobiographical stuff. (2018). . 
 Korea of Juche. (2020) 
The Famine That Never Was - the Democratic People's Republic of Korea in the ‘ Arduous March ‘ period The myth of famine in the DPRK exposed. (2020). .  
A refutation of the false pseudo-academic propaganda against People's Korea. (2020). 
 The Great Conspiracy Against People's Korea. (November 2021). .
 People’s Korea Battles Covid 19 and Wins. (2022).
 Red Suns of Juche- Based Socialism. (April, 2022).
 Juche Philosophy Study Course -KFA UK and the British Group for the Study of the Juche Idea.(June, 2022).

Filmography 

 The Mole: Undercover in North Korea (2020)
 A Friend of Kim (2019)

See also 

 Robert Egan
 Kim Myong-chol
 Alejandro Cao de Benós

References 

1961 births
Living people
Experts on North Korea
British activists
People from Hammersmith
British communists
North Korea–United Kingdom relations
Alumni of the University of Winchester
Communist Party of Great Britain members
New Communist Party of Britain members
Socialist Labour Party (UK) members
People educated at Peter Symonds College